Pospelikha is a rural locality (a selo) and the administrative center of Pospelikhinsky District of Altai Krai, Russia. Population:

References

Sources
 
 

Rural localities in Pospelikhinsky District